is a Japanese manga artist. His major works include Jormugand, a story about a female arms dealer, which ran from 2006 to 2012 in Shogakukan's Monthly Sunday GX magazine, and was made into an anime series.
In 2012, he started the manga series Destro 246 which has charted in Oricon's best-sellers.

Works

References

External links
  

1978 births
Living people
People from Isehara, Kanagawa
Manga artists from Kanagawa Prefecture
Japanese illustrators